Fatemeh Goudarzi (born 10 July 1963)  is an Iranian actress.

Filmography
2017 Nafas (TV series)
2008 Shirin
2007 Dasthay-e Khali  
2006 Marriage, Iranian Style
1996 The Gazelle 
1995 Mikhaham zende Bemanam 
1994 Behesht-e Penhan 
1993 Khaney-e Khalvat  
1992 Mohajeran 
1990 For Everything 
1990 Ra'na (TV series) 
1989 Galesh-haye Madarbozorg (TV series)

References

External links

Iranian television actresses
1964 births
Living people
20th-century Iranian actresses
21st-century Iranian actresses
Place of birth missing (living people)
Crystal Simorgh for Best Actress winners